The 1998 RCA Championships was a tennis tournament played on outdoor hard courts. It was the 11th edition of the event known that year as the RCA Championships, and was part of the Championship Series of the 1998 ATP Tour. It was the 11th edition of the tournament and took place at the Indianapolis Tennis Center in Indianapolis, Indiana, United States. Àlex Corretja won the singles event and Jiří Novák / David Rikl won the doubles title.

Finals

Singles

 Àlex Corretja defeated  Andre Agassi 2–6, 6–2, 6–3 
It was Corretja's third title of the year, and his sixth overall.

Doubles

 Jiří Novák /  David Rikl defeated  Mark Knowles /  Daniel Nestor 6–2, 7–6

References

External links
 ITF – Indianapolis tournament details

RCA Championships
1998
RCA Championships
RCA Championships
RCA Championships